Argon2 is a key derivation function that was selected as the winner of the 2015 Password Hashing Competition. It was designed by Alex Biryukov, Daniel Dinu, and Dmitry Khovratovich from the University of Luxembourg. The reference implementation of Argon2 is released under a Creative Commons CC0 license (i.e. public domain) or the Apache License 2.0, and provides three related versions:

Argon2d maximizes resistance to GPU cracking attacks. It accesses the memory array in a password dependent order, which reduces the possibility of time–memory trade-off (TMTO) attacks, but introduces possible side-channel attacks.
Argon2i is optimized to resist side-channel attacks. It accesses the memory array in a password independent order.
Argon2id is a hybrid version. It follows the Argon2i approach for the first half pass over memory and the Argon2d approach for subsequent passes. The RFC recommends using Argon2id if you do not know the difference between the types or you consider side-channel attacks to be a viable threat.

All three modes allow specification by three parameters that control:
execution time
memory required
degree of parallelism

Cryptanalysis 

While there is no public cryptanalysis applicable to Argon2d, there are two published attacks on the Argon2i function. The first attack is applicable only to the old version of Argon2i, while the second has been extended to the latest version (1.3).

The first attack shows that it is possible to compute a single-pass Argon2i function using between a quarter and a fifth of the desired space with no time penalty, and compute a multiple-pass Argon2i using only / (≈ /2.72) space with no time penalty. According to the Argon2 authors, this attack vector was fixed in version 1.3.

The second attack shows that Argon2i can be computed by an algorithm which has complexity O(7/4 log()) for all choices of parameters  (space cost),  (time cost), and thread-count such that =∗. The Argon2 authors claim that this attack is not efficient if Argon2i is used with three or more passes. However, Joël Alwen and Jeremiah Blocki improved the attack and showed that in order for the attack to fail, Argon2i v1.3 needs more than 10 passes over memory.

Algorithm 

 Function Argon2
    Inputs:
       password (P):       Bytes (0..232-1)    Password (or message) to be hashed
       salt (S):           Bytes (8..232-1)    Salt (16 bytes recommended for password hashing)
       parallelism (p):    Number (1..224-1)   Degree of parallelism (i.e. number of threads)
       tagLength (T):      Number (4..232-1)   Desired number of returned bytes
       memorySizeKB (m):   Number (8p..232-1)  Amount of memory (in kibibytes) to use
       iterations (t):     Number (1..232-1)   Number of iterations to perform
       version (v):        Number (0x13)       The current version is 0x13 (19 decimal)
       key (K):            Bytes (0..232-1)    Optional key (Errata: PDF says 0..32 bytes, RFC says 0..232 bytes)
       associatedData (X): Bytes (0..232-1)    Optional arbitrary extra data
       hashType (y):       Number (0=Argon2d, 1=Argon2i, 2=Argon2id)
    Output:
       tag:                Bytes (tagLength)   The resulting generated bytes, tagLength bytes long
 
    Generate initial 64-byte block H0.
     All the input parameters are concatenated and input as a source of additional entropy.
     Errata: RFC says H0 is 64-bits; PDF says H0 is 64-bytes.
     Errata: RFC says the Hash is H^, the PDF says it's ℋ (but doesn't document what ℋ is). It's actually Blake2b.
     Variable length items are prepended with their length as 32-bit little-endian integers.
    buffer ← parallelism ∥ tagLength ∥ memorySizeKB ∥ iterations ∥ version ∥ hashType
          ∥ Length(password)       ∥ Password
          ∥ Length(salt)           ∥ salt
          ∥ Length(key)            ∥ key
          ∥ Length(associatedData) ∥ associatedData
    H0 ← Blake2b(buffer, 64) //default hash size of Blake2b is 64-bytes
 
    Calculate number of 1 KB blocks by rounding down memorySizeKB to the nearest multiple of 4*parallelism kibibytes
    blockCount ← Floor(memorySizeKB, 4*parallelism)
 
    Allocate two-dimensional array of 1 KiB blocks (parallelism rows x columnCount columns)
    columnCount ← blockCount / parallelism;   //In the RFC, columnCount is referred to as q
 
    Compute the first and second block (i.e. column zero and one ) of each lane (i.e. row)
    for i ← 0 to parallelism-1 do for each row
       Bi[0] ← Hash(H0 ∥ 0 ∥ i, 1024) //Generate a 1024-byte digest
       Bi[1] ← Hash(H0 ∥ 1 ∥ i, 1024) //Generate a 1024-byte digest
 
    Compute remaining columns of each lane
    for i ← 0 to parallelism-1 do //for each row
       for j ← 2 to columnCount-1 do //for each subsequent column
          //i' and j' indexes depend if it's Argon2i, Argon2d, or Argon2id (See section 3.4)
          i′, j′ ← GetBlockIndexes(i, j)  //the GetBlockIndexes function is not defined
          Bi[j] = G(Bi[j-1], Bi′[j′]) //the G hash function is not defined
 
    Further passes when iterations > 1
    for nIteration ← 2 to iterations do
       for i ← 0 to parallelism-1 do for each row
         for j ← 0 to columnCount-1 do //for each subsequent column
            //i' and j' indexes depend if it's Argon2i, Argon2d, or Argon2id (See section 3.4)
            i′, j′ ← GetBlockIndexes(i, j)
            if j == 0 then 
              Bi[0] = Bi[0] xor G(Bi[columnCount-1], Bi′[j′])
            else
              Bi[j] = Bi[j] xor G(Bi[j-1], Bi′[j′])
 
    Compute final block C as the XOR of the last column of each row
    C ← B0[columnCount-1]
    for i ← 1 to parallelism-1 do
       C ← C xor Bi[columnCount-1]
 
    Compute output tag
    return Hash(C, tagLength)

Variable-length hash function 

Argon2 makes use of a hash function capable of producing digests up to 232 bytes long. This hash function is internally built upon Blake2.

 Function Hash(message, digestSize)
    Inputs:
       message:         Bytes (0..232-1)     Message to be hashed
       digestSize:      Integer (1..232)     Desired number of bytes to be returned
    Output:
       digest:          Bytes (digestSize)   The resulting generated bytes, digestSize bytes long
 
    Hash is a variable-length hash function, built using Blake2b, capable of generating
    digests up to 232 bytes.
 
    If the requested digestSize is 64-bytes or lower, then we use Blake2b directly
    if (digestSize <= 64) then
       return Blake2b(digestSize ∥ message, digestSize) //concatenate 32-bit little endian digestSize with the message bytes
 
    For desired hashes over 64-bytes (e.g. 1024 bytes for Argon2 blocks),
    we use Blake2b to generate twice the number of needed 64-byte blocks,
    and then only use 32-bytes from each block
 
    Calculate the number of whole blocks (knowing we're only going to use 32-bytes from each)
    r ← Ceil(digestSize/32)-1;
 
    Generate r whole blocks.
    Initial block is generated from message
    V1 ← Blake2b(digestSize ∥ message, 64);
    Subsequent blocks are generated from previous blocks
    for i ← 2 to r do
       Vi ← Blake2b(Vi-1, 64)
    Generate the final (possibly partial) block
    partialBytesNeeded ← digestSize – 32*r;
    Vr+1 ← Blake2b(Vr, partialBytesNeeded)
 
    Concatenate the first 32-bytes of each block Vi
    (except the possibly partial last block, which we take the whole thing)
    Let Ai represent the lower 32-bytes of block Vi
    return A1 ∥ A2 ∥ ... ∥ Ar ∥ Vr+1

References

External links 
Argon2 source code repository on Github
Argon2 specification
Password Hashing Competition
Uni.Lu Argon2 Page
Balloon Hashing: A Memory-Hard Function Providing Provable Protection Against Sequential Attacks
 Argon2 Memory-Hard Function for Password Hashing and Proof-of-Work Applications

Key derivation functions
2015 in computing